Simple majority may refer to:
 Majority, a voting requirement of more than half of all ballots cast
 Plurality (voting), a voting requirement of more ballots cast for a proposition than for any other option
 First-past-the-post voting, the single-winner version of an election with plurality voting and one vote per person

See also 
 Supermajority, a voting requirement of a specified level of support which is greater than the "one half" threshold used for a simple majority.

de:Mehrheit#Einfache Mehrheit